Janice Law (born 1941), also known as Janice Law Trecker, is an American mystery novelist and short story writer. She has written for Alfred Hitchcock's Mystery Magazine, Ellery Queen's Mystery Magazine, Sherlock Holmes Mystery Magazine, The Midwest Quarterly, The American Scholar, and the American Quarterly. She is best known for her Anna Peters series of novels, which was one of the first to feature a female detective.

Law is a graduate of Syracuse University and the University of Connecticut, where she served as an instructor and assistant professor of English.

Law was nominated for an Edgar Award in 1977 for her first Anna Peters novel, The Big Payoff. In 2013, she was nominated for the Lambda Literary Award for Gay Mystery for Fires of London, the first novel in her Francis Bacon series, and won the award the following year for its sequel, The Prisoner of the Riviera.

Awards

Publications

Anna Peters mysteries
The Big Payoff (1975)
Gemini Trip (1977)
Under Orion (1978)
The Shadow of the Palms (1980)
Death Under Par (1980)
Time Lapse (1998)
Backfire (1994)
Cross-Check (1997)

Francis Bacon mysteries
Fires of London (2012)
The Prisoner of the Riviera (2013)
Moon Over Tangier (2014)
Nights in Berlin (2016)
Afternoons in Paris (2017)
Mornings in London (2017)

Other works
Preachers, Rebels, and Traders: Connecticut, 1818-1865 (1975)
Women on the Move (1975)
All the King's Ladies (1986)
The Countess (1989)
Infected Be the Air (1991)
A Safe Place to Die (1995)
The Night Bus (2000)
The Lost Diaries of Iris Weed (2002)
Voices (2003)
Blood in the Water and Other Secrets (2011)

References

External links 

 Official website

20th-century American novelists
21st-century American novelists
American mystery writers
Living people
Women mystery writers
20th-century American women writers
21st-century American women writers
American women novelists
1941 births